Hannan Majid is a British documentary filmmaker.

Early life
Hannan Majid's parents are originally from Dhaka, but they immigrated to Bradford, West Yorkshire (England), where Majid was born. He graduated from the Northern Film School in Leeds in 2004 with a Bachelor of Arts degree in moving images and film production.

Rainbow Collective

In 2006, Majid founded Rainbow Collective, a documentary film production company based in London, with Richard York. The company specialises in creating documentaries highlighting human and children's rights issues.

Majid has filmed, directed and produced documentaries in South Africa, Bangladesh, Iraq and the UK, and has won awards in Dubai, France and the Czech Republic. They have collaborated with TRAID (Textiles Recycling for Aid and International Development), War On Want, Amnesty International, The Consortium For Street Children, Labour Behind the Label, The Childhood Trust, Campaign Against Arms Trade, British Red Cross, Roundhouse Theatre, University of the Arts, SOAS and International Labor Rights Forum. Their films have been exhibited at film festivals, including Abu Dhabi, Cambridge, Bite The Mango, Cape Town, Durban, East End, Leeds International, and AlJazeera International Documentary.

The Rainbow Collective's 30-minute documentary filmTears in the Fabric focused on one family in the aftermath of the 2013 Savar building collapse. It premiered at Regent's University London in 2014.

In partnership with TRAID, "they have made a series of citizen journalist films with Cambodian garment workers" that Lucy Siegle, writing in The Guardian in 2017, considered "well worth a watch".

In August 2017, they became members of DIGNItex, a platform for defending decent jobs in the garment industry.

Filmography

See also
 British Bangladeshi
 List of British Bangladeshis

References

Further reading

External links
 
 Rainbow Collective website
 Sunday Tribune

Year of birth missing (living people)
Living people
English people of Bangladeshi descent
English film directors
English documentary filmmakers
Mass media people from Bradford
Alumni of the Northern Film School
Film people from Yorkshire